West Central Tribune is an American, English-language newspaper published twice weekly on Wednesdays and Saturdays in Willmar, Minnesota. Its circulation of more than 16,000 papers is distributed throughout many surrounding communities.

History
The West Central Tribune originated with the Willmar Tribune, which was founded by Dr. Christian Johnson on February 19, 1895.  Dr. Johnson was a supporter of the People's Part, which supported the small farmer and laborer.  The paper started out as a four-page, eighth-column journal and eventually was expanded to eight pages.  In addition to local and national news, the newspaper also included articles on progressive farming and the news in Sweden, Norway, and Denmark, from which many residents had immigrated.  Dr. Johnson turned the paper over to Victor E. Lawson (1871–1960) in August 1895.  Lawson remained the editor of the paper for over fifty years.  The newspaper has had several names:
 West Central Tribune (1980–current)
 West Central Daily Tribune (1959–1980)
 West Central Minnesota Daily Tribune (1950–1959)
 Willmar Daily Tribune (1928–1950)
 Willmar Weekly Tribune (1931–1950)
 Willmar Tribune (1895–1931)

References

Newspapers published in Minnesota
Willmar, Minnesota